is an athletic stadium in Ashikaga, Tochigi, Japan.

It was used J2 League games.

References

External links
Official site

Sports venues in Tochigi Prefecture
Football venues in Japan